Incipit Satan is the fifth full-length album by Norwegian black metal band Gorgoroth. It was released on 7 February 2000 by Nuclear Blast, and reissued in 2006 by Back on Black Records. Incipit Satan was the first album with King ov Hell as bassist, the last album to feature Tormentor on guitar and the only one with Sjt. Erichsen on drums. The band members dedicated the album to their deceased friend and former bandmate Erik Brødreskift (a.k.a. "Grim").

Track listing

Personnel
Gaahl – vocals, vocal arrangements (tracks 1–4, 6, 7)
Infernus – guitars, bass, drums, vocals (track 5)
Tormentor – guitars, additional vocals (track 4)
King ov Hell – bass
Sjt. Erichsen – drums
Daimonion – synthesizer, piano
Mickey Faust – vocals (track 8)

Production
Gorgoroth – production, editing
Jocke Petterson – production, recording, engineering, mixing, mastering
Infernus – mixing, mastering
Herr Brandt – editing, mixing, mastering
Mia – editing

References

Gorgoroth albums
2000 albums
Nuclear Blast albums